Ibrahim ibn Malik al-Ashtar ibn al-Harith al-Nakha'i (died October 691), better known as Ibrahim ibn al-Ashtar was an Arab commander who fought in the service of Caliph Ali (r. 656–661) and later served the pro-Alid leader al-Mukhtar al-Thaqafi. He led al-Mukhtar's forces to a decisive victory at the Battle of Khazir (686) against the Umayyads under Ubayd Allah ibn Ziyad, who was personally slain by Ibn al-Ashtar.

Family and early life
Ibrahim was the son of Malik al-Ashtar ibn al-Harith, a commander in the Rashidun army and partisan of Caliph Ali. The family belonged to the Banu Nakha', hence their epithet al-Nakha'i. The Banu Nakha' was part of the larger tribe of Madh'hij. Ibrahim had a brother from the same mother but different father named Abd al-Rahman ibn Abd Allah al-Nakha'i, who also was a warrior. Like his father, Ibrahim is also reported to have fought alongside Ali against the Banu Umayya at the Battle of Siffin in 657.

Career
Ibn al-Ashtar's prominence rose after he entered the service of the pro-Alid and anti-Umayyad leader al-Mukhtar al-Thaqafi. The latter took over Kufa in 685/86 and was soon after confronted by an invading Umayyad army from Syria under the command of Ubayd Allah ibn Ziyad. Al-Mukhtar charged Ibn al-Ashtar with command over his mostly Persian mawali troops from Kufa to prevent the Umayyad advance into Iraq. Ibn al-Ashtar marched northward with his forces and fought the Umayyads at the Battle of Khazir east of Mosul. He inflicted a disastrous defeat on the Umayyads, personally slaying Ubayd Allah, while other senior Umayyad commanders, such as Husayn ibn Numayr al-Sakuni, were also slain.  He had their heads sent to al-Mukhtar, who in turn sent them to the anti-Umayyad caliph of Medina and Iraq, Abd Allah ibn al-Zubayr.

By 687, al-Mukhtar had appointed Ibn al-Ashtar governor of Mosul, which came under al-Mukhtar's control following the Umayyad rout at Khazir. That same year, al-Mukhtar and his retinue were besieged in Kufa by Ibn al-Zubayr's brother Mus'ab, and al-Mukhtar was killed in the ensuing clashes. Afterward, Ibn al-Ashtar defected to the Zubayrids, despite the efforts of Umayyad caliph Abd al-Malik to woo him to the Umayyad side. Ibn al-Ashtar was ultimately killed fighting alongside Mus'ab at the Battle of Maskin in October 691, during which the Umayyads defeated the Zubayrids and subsequently conquered Iraq. After the battle's conclusion, Ibn al-Ashtar's body was confiscated and burned by the Umayyad forces. His son Nu'man served as a commander of the Madh'hij and Banu Asad contingent of the Kufan troops of Yazid ibn al-Muhallab during the latter's rebellion against the Umayyads in 720.

Assessment
Ibn al-Ashtar is described as the "most talented commander Kufa produced during the Marwanid period" (684–750) by historian Hugh N. Kennedy.

References

Bibliography

691 deaths
7th-century Arabs
Arab generals
People of the Second Fitna
Generals of the Rashidun Caliphate